The 2012 United States Senate election in Wisconsin took place on November 6, 2012, alongside a U.S. presidential election as well as other elections to the United States Senate and House of Representatives and various state and local elections. Incumbent Democratic Senator Herb Kohl retired instead of running for re-election to a fifth term. This was the first open Senate seat in Wisconsin since 1988, when Kohl won his first term.

Primary elections were held on August 14, 2012. Congresswoman Tammy Baldwin of Wisconsin's 2nd congressional district ran unopposed in the Democratic primary. The Republican nominee was former Wisconsin Governor and U.S. Secretary of Health and Human Services Tommy Thompson, who won with a plurality in a four-way primary race. In the general election, Baldwin defeated Thompson and won the open seat. She became the first woman elected to represent Wisconsin in the Senate and the first openly gay U.S. senator in history. This is also the first time Thompson lost a statewide race.

Background 
Incumbent Democratic senator Herb Kohl was re-elected to a fourth term in 2006, beating Republican attorney Robert Lorge by 67% to 30%. Kohl's lack of fundraising suggested his potential retirement. There was speculation that Kohl might decide to retire so as to allow Russ Feingold, who lost his re-election bid in 2010, to run again, although Mike Tate, chairman of the Wisconsin Democratic Party, dismissed speculation about Kohl's potential retirement. Ultimately, Kohl announced in May 2011 that he would not run for re-election in 2012.

Democratic primary 
Despite speculation that Kohl would retire to make way for his former Senate colleague Russ Feingold, who had been unseated in 2010, Feingold chose not to enter the race. Other potential candidates also declined to run, so Baldwin was unopposed in the Democratic primary.

Candidates

Declared 
 Tammy Baldwin, U.S. representative

Declined 
 Tom Barrett, mayor of Milwaukee
 Kathleen Falk, former Dane County executive
 Russ Feingold, former U.S. senator
 Steve Kagen, former U.S. representative
 Ron Kind, U.S. representative
 Herb Kohl, incumbent U.S. senator
 Gwen Moore, U.S. representative
 Tim Sullivan, businessman

Polling

Results

Republican primary 

Congressman and House Budget Committee Chairman Paul Ryan stated he would not run if Kohl sought reelection, but would contemplate a run if Kohl retired. Ryan later stated that he was "95 percent sure" that he would not run. He was later chosen as the Republican nominee for vice president by presidential nominee Mitt Romney.

Six candidates declared for the seat, although two later withdrew. The contest turned out to be a four-way fight and although a large majority of Republican primary voters consistently expressed a preference for a nominee "more conservative" than Tommy Thompson, Eric Hovde and Mark Neumann split the conservative vote, allowing Thompson to narrowly prevail with a plurality of the vote.

Candidates

Declared 
 Jeff Fitzgerald, Speaker of the Wisconsin State Assembly
 Eric Hovde, businessman
 Mark Neumann, former U.S. representative, nominee for the U.S. Senate in 1998, and candidate for Governor in 2010
 Tommy Thompson, former governor of Wisconsin and former secretary of Health and Human Services

Withdrew 
 Frank Lasee, state senator (endorsed Eric Hovde)
 Kip Smith, physical therapist

Declined 
 Mark Andrew Green, former U.S. representative and former United States ambassador to Tanzania
 Theodore Kanavas, former state senator
 Paul Ryan, U.S. representative
 Tim Sullivan, businessman
 J. B. Van Hollen, Wisconsin attorney general

Polling

  Commissioned by Eric Hovde

Endorsements

Results

General election

Candidates 
 Tammy Baldwin (Democratic), U.S. Representative
 Tommy Thompson (Republican), former governor and former Secretary of Health and Human Services
 Joseph Kexel (Libertarian), IT consultant
 Nimrod Allen III (Independent), consultant and former Marine

Debates 
Baldwin and Thompson agreed to three debates: September 28, October 18 and 26, all broadcast statewide, and nationwide through C-SPAN.

The first debate originated from the studios of Milwaukee Public Television and was coordinated by the Wisconsin Broadcasters Association. It aired on MPTV, Wisconsin Public Television, Wisconsin Public Radio and several commercial stations throughout the state.

The second debate originated from the Theater for Civic Engagement on the campus of the University of Wisconsin–Marathon County in Wausau and was coordinated by WPT/WPR, the Milwaukee Journal Sentinel and Milwaukee's WTMJ-TV. Again it was carried on MPTV, WPT/WPR, and several commercial stations, including WTMJ-TV.

The third debate originated from Eckstein Hall on the campus of Marquette University Law School and was coordinated by WISN-TV in Milwaukee. It aired on that station and across the state's other ABC affiliated stations.

External links
 Complete video of debate, September 28, 2012 - C-SPAN
 Complete video of debate, October 18, 2012 - C-SPAN
 Complete video of debate, October 26, 2012 - C-SPAN

Fundraising

Top contributors

Top industries

Predictions

Polling 

with Tammy Baldwin

with Russ Feingold

with Steve Kagen

with Ron Kind

with Herb Kohl

Results

Aftermath
Brian Schimming, the vice chairman of the Wisconsin Republican Party, partly blamed Thompson's defeat on the fact that he had to face a competitive primary whereas Baldwin was unopposed for the Democratic nomination: "[Thompson] blew all his money going through the primary. So when he gets through the primary, it was like three weeks before he was up on the air. [Baldwin] piled on immediately." He claimed "If [Thompson] hadn't had as ugly a primary, we could have won that seat."

See also
 2012 United States Senate elections
 2012 United States House of Representatives elections in Wisconsin
 2012 Wisconsin gubernatorial recall election

References

External links
 Elections & Voting  at the Wisconsin Government Accountability Board
 Campaign contributions at OpenSecrets.org
 Outside spending at Sunlight Foundation
 Candidate issue positions at On the Issues

Official candidate sites (Archived)
 Tammy Baldwin for U.S. Senate
 Tommy Thompson for U.S. Senate
 Joe Kexel for U.S. Senate
 Nimrod Allen III for U.S. Senate

Wisconsin
2012
Senate